Armenia–Romania relations refers to bilateral relations between Armenia and Romania.  Both countries established diplomatic relations on December 17, 1991. Armenia has an embassy in Bucharest; Romania has an embassy in Yerevan.  Both countries are members of the Organization of the Black Sea Economic Cooperation.

There are around 3,000 people of Armenian descent living in Romania. Modern relationships between Armenia and Romania are rooted in part in the modern history of the Armenian people: after the Armenian genocide of 1915, Romania was the first state to officially provide shelter and refugee camps to refugees from the area; and when in October 2007 the President of Armenia, Serzh Sargsyan, received the delegation headed by the Romanian Minister of National Defense, Teodor Meleșcanu, he noted that the Armenian-Romanian friendship was deeply rooted in history and it was not by accident that Romania was the first country to formally recognize the independence of Armenia from the USSR."

See also 
 Foreign relations of Armenia
 Foreign relations of Romania
 Armenians of Romania
 Armenia–EU relations

References

External links 
  Romanian Ministry of Foreign Affairs: direction of the Romania embassy in Yerevan
  Romanian Ministry of Foreign Affairs: direction of the Armenian embassy in Bucharest

 
Romania 
Bilateral relations of Romania